A New Account of the Tales of the World, also known as Shishuo Xinyu , was compiled and edited by Liu Yiqing (Liu I-ching; 劉義慶; 403–444) during the Liu Song dynasty (420–479) of the Northern and Southern dynasties (420–589). It is a historical compilation of many Chinese scholars, musicians, and artists during the 2nd-4th centuries.

Content 
The book contains around 1,130 historical anecdotes and character sketches of around 600 literati, musicians and painters who lived in the Han and Wei–Jin periods (2nd-4th centuries). Chapter 19, for instance, has 32 stories about outstanding women. It is thus both a biographical source and a record of colloquial language. The original text of the book was divided into eight volumes of juan (卷 "scroll"), though current editions generally span ten volumes.

Historical accuracy 
Although most of the anecdotes and personalities are attested in other sources, traditional Chinese bibliographers did not classify Shishuo Xinyu as history but as a novel / "minor talk" (小说 xiao shuo), a term that was later used to refer to fiction. Some attribute this to its use of colloquial language as well as how it did not follow the historical conventions of the Twenty-Four Histories. The mixture of literary and vernacular styles set the scene for the later tradition of informal Chinese literature. The 20th-century Chinese novelist Lu Xun also spoke highly of the book's aesthetic merits.

Translations 
The text has been translated in full into English, with the Liang dynasty (502–557) commentary by Liu Xiaobiao (劉孝標), in Richard B. Mather, Shih-shuo Hsin-yü: A New Account of Tales of the World.

Extant versions 
Manuscript:
Hand-written fragments from the Tang dynasty (618–907) (唐寫本殘卷)
Woodblock prints:
Dong Fen edition, 1138 (8th year of the Shaoxing reign of the Southern Song); original kept in Japan (南宋紹興八年董弅刊本，原本存於日本)
Edition by Lu You, 1188 (15th year of the Chunxi reign of the Southern Song; 南宋淳熙十五年陸游刻本)
Edition from Hunan, 1189 (16th year of Chunxi) (淳熙十六年湘中刻本)

Categories 
 Virtuous Conduct 德行第一
 Speech and Conversation 言語第二
 Affairs of State 政事第三
 Letters and Scholarship 文學第四
 The Square and the Proper 方正第五
 Cultivated Tolerance 雅量第六
 Insight and Judgment 識鑑第七
 Appreciation and Praise 賞譽第八
 Grading Excellence 品藻第九
 Admonitions and Warnings 規箴第十
 Quick Perception 捷悟第十一
 Precocious Intelligence 夙惠第十二
 Virility and Boldness 豪爽第十三
 Appearance and Manner 容止第十四
 Self-renewal 自新第十五
 Admiration and Emulation 企羨第十六
 Grieving for the Departed 傷逝第十七
 Reclusion and Disengagement 栖逸第十八
 Worthy Beauties 賢媛第十九
 Technical Understanding 術解第二十
 Skill and Art 巧藝第二十一
 Favor and Veneration  寵禮第二十二
 The Free and Unrestrained 任誕第二十三
 Rudeness and Arrogance 簡傲第二十四
 Taunting and Teasing 排調第二十五
 Contempt and Insults 輕詆第二十六
 Guile and Chicanery 假譎第二十七
 Dismissal from Office 黜免第二十八
 Stinginess and Meanness 儉嗇第二十九
 Extravagance and Ostentation 汰侈第三十
 Anger and Irascibility 忿狷第三十一
 Slander and Treachery  讒險第三十二
 Blameworthiness and Remorse 尤悔第三十三
 Crudities and Slips of the Tongue 紕漏第三十四
 Delusion and Infatuation 惑溺第三十五
 Hostility and Alienation 仇隙第三十六

References and notes

Further reading 
 Nanxiu Qian. Spirit and Self in Medieval China : The Shih-Shuo Hsin-Yü and Its Legacy. (Honolulu: University of Hawaii Press,  2001).   .
Jack W. Chen. Anecdote, Network, Gossip, Performance : Essays on the Shishuo xinyu (Cambridge: Harvard University Asia Center, 2021).   .

Chinese anthologies
Southern and Northern Dynasties literature
History books about the Northern and Southern dynasties
5th-century books
Chinese history texts
Chinese short story collections
Books by Liu Yiqing